1Y or 1-Y may refer to:
UH-1Y; see H-1 upgrade program
Bell UH-1Y Venom
SSH 1Y (WA); see Washington State Route 532
1Y-J, a model of Toyota Y engine
1Y, IATA code for Sun Air (Sudan)
1Y, IATA code for Electronic Data Systems
 1-Y classification in the U.S. Selective Service System, no longer in use

See also
Year
Y1 (disambiguation)